Belaya is a rural locality (a village) in Opokskoye Rural Settlement, Velikoustyugsky District, Vologda Oblast, Russia. The population was 52 as of 2002.

Geography 
Belaya is located 121 km northwest of Veliky Ustyug (the district's administrative centre) by road. Sukhonsky is the nearest rural locality.

References 

Rural localities in Velikoustyugsky District